Macrozamia lomandroides is a species of plant in the family Zamiaceae. It is endemic to Australia.  Its natural habitat is subtropical or tropical dry forests.

References

lomandroides
Vulnerable flora of Australia
Nature Conservation Act endangered biota
Vulnerable biota of Queensland
Endangered flora of Australia
Flora of Queensland
Taxonomy articles created by Polbot